Nicolet—Yamaska was a federal electoral district in Quebec, Canada, that was represented in the House of Commons of Canada from 1935 to 1968.

History

This riding was created in 1933 from Nicolet and Yamaska ridings.

It was defined initially to consist of:
 the county of Nicolet except such part thereof as is included in the municipalities of Lemieux Ste-Cécile-de-Lévrard, St-Joseph-de-Blandford, Ste-Marie-de-Blandford, St-Pierre-les-Becquets, Ste-Sophie-de-Lévrard and the village of Manseau;
 the county of Yamaska except that part of the parish and the village of St-Michel lying west of the river Yamaska.

In 1947, it was redefined to consist of:
 the county of Nicolet, (except the municipalities of Lemieux, Ste. Cécile-de-Lévrard, St. Joseph-de-Blandford, Ste. Marie-de-Blandford, St. Pierre-les-Becquets, Ste. Sophie-de-Lévrard and the villages of Manseau and les Becquets), and the town of Nicolet;
 the county of Yamaska;
 that part of the county of Drummond included in the municipalities of St. Edmond-de-Grantham and St. Majorique-de-Grantham;
 that part of the county of Arthabaska included in the municipalities of Ste. Anne-du-Sault and Maddington and the village of Daveluyville;
 that part of the county of Richelieu included in the municipality of St. Marcel.

In 1952, it was redefined to consist of:
 the county of Nicolet (except the municipality of Lemieux, the parish municipalities of Sainte-Cécile-de-Lévrard, Saint-Joseph-de-Blandford, Sainte-Marie-de-Blandford, Saint-Pierre-les-Becquets, Sainte-Sophie-de-Lévrard, and the village municipalities of Manseau and Les-Becquets), and the town of Nicolet;
 the county of Yamaska;
 that part of the county of Drummond included in the parish municipalities of Saint-Edmond-de-Grantham and Saint-Majorique-de-Grantham;
 that part of the county of Arthabaska included in the parish municipality of Sainte-Anne-du-Sault, the township municipality of Maddington and the village municipality of Daveluyville;
 that part of the county of Richelieu included in the parish municipality of Saint-Marcel.

It was abolished in 1966 when it was redistributed into Lotbinière, Drummond and Richelieu ridings.

Members of Parliament

This riding elected the following Members of Parliament:

Election results

|Droit vital personnel
|H.-Georges Grenier
|align=right|44

See also 

 List of Canadian federal electoral districts
 Past Canadian electoral districts

External links 
 Riding history from the Library of Parliament

Former federal electoral districts of Quebec